This is a list of Cambodian films of 2002.

References

References

2002
Films
Cambodian